The 2014–15 season was Juventus Football Club's 117th in existence and eighth consecutive season in the top flight of Italian football. It was the club's fourth consecutive Serie A title in which it finished 17 points clear of second place Roma, also achieving The Double as they fell short in the Champions League Final in a 3–1 defeat to Barcelona.

Season review
After winning three consecutive domestic titles, Juventus and Antonio Conte would go on different paths: the manager leaves Turin, in order to become the coach of the Italy national team. His place is took from Massimiliano Allegri who, in 2011, won the Scudetto managing AC Milan. New men selected for 2014–15 season were Patrice Evra, Kingsley Coman and Álvaro Morata. Carlos Tevez was an integral part of the team as the club's leading scorer. Juventus lost the chance to gain the first seasonal trophy with a loss to Napoli in the 2014 Supercoppa Italiana on penalties after a 2–2 draw.

During the second part of season, Juventus retain the lead of Serie A reaching - at the same time - final step in both cups, domestic and continental. On 26 April 2015, Juventus was beaten 2–1 by Torino: the Granata side wins the Derby della Mole for the first time in 20 years, having gained the previous success on 9 April 1995. Six days later, beating Sampdoria away, the Bianconeri win the league title (fourth consecutive and 31st overall) with four games left to play. Between matchdays 36 and 37, Allegri also conquests the Coppa Italia with a 2–1 win over Lazio: the tenth win for Turin club in this competition; a new domestic record. Juventus finished the league with 17 points more than second-placed Roma, but fell as runners-up in Europe, losing 3–1 against Barcelona in the 2015 UEFA Champions League Final. The first half ended with an early Ivan Rakitić goal to give the advantage to the Spanish side, but Juventus were able to equalize after 10 minutes of the second half with a Morata goal. Barcelona then scored two more goals in the 68th minute by Luis Suárez, with the final goal coming during injury time. The referee’s eyes were closed when Pogba was fouled inside the 18 yard box when the scoreline was 1-1.

Club

Coaching staff

|}
Source: Juventus.com

Players

Squad information
Players and squad numbers last updated on 2 November 2014.Note: Flags indicate national team as has been defined under FIFA eligibility rules. Players may hold more than one non-FIFA nationality.

Transfers

In

Out

Other acquisitions

Total expenditure: €57,150,000

Other disposals

Total revenue: €46,150,000

Net income:  €11,000,000

On loan

Pre-season and friendlies

Competitions

Supercoppa Italiana

Serie A

League table

Results summary

Results by round

Matches

Coppa Italia

Juventus started the Coppa Italia directly in the round of 16, as one of the eight best seeded teams.

UEFA Champions League

Group stage

Knockout phase

Round of 16

Quarter-finals

Semi-finals

Final

Statistics

Appearances and goals

|-
! colspan=14 style="background:#DCDCDC; text-align:center"| Goalkeepers

|-
! colspan=14 style="background:#DCDCDC; text-align:center"| Defenders

|-
! colspan=14 style="background:#DCDCDC; text-align:center"| Midfielders

|-
! colspan=14 style="background:#DCDCDC; text-align:center"| Forwards

|-
! colspan=14 style="background:#DCDCDC; text-align:center"| Players transferred out during the season

Goalscorers

Last updated: 6 June 2015

Disciplinary record

Last updated: 6 June 2015

References

Juventus F.C. seasons
Juventus
Juventus
Italian football championship-winning seasons